Fuzzy the Hero ( and ) is a 1973 Italian-Spanish western film directed by Tulio Demicheli, composed by Coriolano Gori and starred by Eduardo Fajardo, John Bartha and Roberto Camardiel.

Cast

References

External links 
 

Films directed by Tulio Demicheli
Spanish Western (genre) comedy films
Italian Western (genre) comedy films
1973 films
Films scored by Lallo Gori
1970s Western (genre) comedy films
1973 comedy films
1970s Italian films